Roberta Vinci was the defending champion, but decided to play at the Estoril Open instead.
Sara Errani won this tournament, defeating Elena Vesnina in the final, 7–5, 6–4. With this win, Errani extended her clay court winning streak to 15.

Seeds

Draw

Finals

Top half

Bottom half

Qualifying

Seeds

Qualifiers

Qualifying draw

First qualifier

Second qualifier

Third qualifier

Fourth qualifier

External links 
 Main draw
 Qualifying draw

2012 Singles
Budapest Grand Prix - Singles